A Miss Mallard Mystery is a mystery animated series produced by the CINAR Corporation and Shanghai Animation Film Studio for the Teletoon network and OTV (Shanghai Media Group), loosely based on the Robert Quackenbush book series The Miss Mallard Mysteries. Each episode focuses on Miss Mallard and her nephew Willard Widgeon as they visit various places around the world, solving mysteries. All characters in the show are ducks or resemble ducks.

Plot
The famous "ducktective", Miss Mallard, from the children's books, stars in her own TV series solving mysteries all over the world with her nephew, Willard. No matter where Miss Mallard and her nephew travel, they are inevitably caught up in the most intriguing investigations. Creative and… More endlessly resourceful, Miss Mallard's capable wings can transform a hairpin, a parasol, or a handkerchief into the most unconventional crime-fighting tools. Uncovering clues while escaping suspicious accidents and avoiding mysterious disasters can be tough work, but Miss Mallard always catches her duck! Filled with clues and "hidden evidence", each mystery encourages its viewers to follow the clues and solve the mystery with Miss Mallard.

Characters
 Miss Marjorie Mallard - World-famous "ducktective".
 Willard Widgeon - Miss Mallard's accident-prone nephew and member of the Swiss police.
 Chief Inspector Bufflehead - Willard's often credulous superior and chief inspector of the Swiss police.

Episodes

See also
Miss Marple, a preceding mystery-solver with similar name alliteration and choice of hats

References

External links
 Big Cartoon Database: A Miss Mallard Mystery

2000s Canadian animated television series
2000 Canadian television series debuts
2001 Canadian television series endings
Canadian children's animated fantasy television series
Canadian children's animated mystery television series
This TV
Teletoon original programming
Television series by Cookie Jar Entertainment
Animated television series about ducks